Benjamin Ferguson (February 14, 1820 – April 19, 1888) was a Scottish American politician and farmer. He was one of the first settlers of Fox Lake, Wisconsin, and served a single two-year term (1860–61) representing Dodge County in the Wisconsin State Senate.

Biography
Born in Penobscot, Maine, he was descended from the Clan Fergusson, through his Scottish immigrant father, William Ferguson.  Benjamin Ferguson moved to the Wisconsin Territory in 1844 and became one of the first settlers at Fox Lake, building the first frame house in the village.  He established a farm on much of the land that later became the village of Fox Lake, and engaged in farming for most of the rest of his life.

Ferguson's first attempt at public office was in 1847, when he was nominated for Sheriff of Dodge County.  He lost that election, but was elected on his second attempt, serving from 1852 to 1854.

In 1857, he was the Democratic candidate for Wisconsin State Senate in the 22nd District, but was defeated by Republican future-Governor William E. Smith.  In January 1858, Ferguson became Postmaster of Dodge County, and held that office until November 1859.

On May 4, 1858, Fox Lake officially incorporated as a village.  In April 1859, Ferguson was elected the second Village President, defeating William E. Smith in that election.  Later that year, he again challenged Smith over his seat in the Wisconsin State Senate. This time Ferguson prevailed, and served as Dodge County's representative in the Senate for the 1860 and 1861 sessions.

In April 1861, Ferguson was again elected Village President.  He was elected again in 1862, 1876, and 1878.  He also served as Fox Lake's representative on the Dodge County Board of Supervisors for 1861, 1870, 1871, and 1872, and was Chairman of the County Board in 1878 and 1879.

In the 1861 election, Ferguson was the Democratic Party's nominee for Governor of Wisconsin.  He was defeated by Republican Louis P. Harvey.

Family and personal life

In 1848, Benjamin Ferguson married Phoebe Ann Green, the widow of David Green.  Mr. and Mrs. Ferguson had four children, but only one survived infancy.  Mrs. Ferguson had three children from her previous marriage.

Electoral history

| colspan="6" style="text-align:center;background-color: #e9e9e9;"| General Election, November 5, 1861

References 

1820 births
1888 deaths
Farmers from Wisconsin
People from Hancock County, Maine
People from Fox Lake, Wisconsin
County supervisors in Wisconsin
Wisconsin sheriffs
Democratic Party Wisconsin state senators